Bentley is an unincorporated community in Hettinger County, North Dakota, United States. Its altitude is 2,349 feet (716 m), and it is located at  (46.3291712, -102.0634868). It was founded in 1910.

References

External links
 50th anniversary, Bentley, North Dakota, June 29,1960 :grow with Bentley, 1910-1960 from the Digital Horizons website

Populated places established in 1910
Unincorporated communities in North Dakota
Unincorporated communities in Hettinger County, North Dakota